Dontaye Dominic Draper (born August 10, 1984) is an American-Croatian former professional basketball player who last played for Real Betis Energía Plus of the Liga ACB.

High school
Draped played high school basketball at Walbrook High School, in Baltimore, Maryland.
He averaged 18 PPG in his first year. In his second year he averaged 34 PPG highschool high for PPG. Later touring his ACL. Made a come back though.

College career
Draper played college basketball at the College of Charleston, with the Charleston Cougars, from 2003 to 2007.

Professional career
Draper began his professional career in 2007–08 with the Sydney Kings of the Australian National Basketball League (NBL). He then joined the French League club Hyeres-Toulon for the start of the 2008–09 season. In December 2008, he joined the Belgian League club BC Oostende.

He then signed with the Italian Second Division club Prima Veroli for the 2009–10 season. He next joined the Adriatic League club Cedevita Zagreb for the 2010–11 season. He was named the EuroCup MVP in 2011. After two seasons with Cedevita Zagreb, he was signed by Real Madrid.

On July 2, 2014, Draper signed a two-year deal with the Turkish team Anadolu Efes. On August 3, 2015, he left Efes, and signed a one-year deal with the Russian club Lokomotiv Kuban.

On July 20, 2016, Draper returned to Real Madrid for the 2016–17 season.

On November 14, 2017, Draper signed with Real Betis Energía Plus for the rest of the 2017–18 ACB season. On February 13, 2018, he parted ways with Sevilla after appearing in eight games.

Croatian national team
While in the process of acquiring his Croatian citizenship, Draper made the list of 25 players who were senior Croatian national team candidates for the EuroBasket 2011. In July 2011, shortly after having received his Croatian citizenship, Draper played his first game for the national team. He also played at the 2013 EuroBasket.

He also represented Croatia at the 2015 EuroBasket, where they were eliminated in the round of final 16 by the Czech Republic.

References

External links
 Dontaye Draper at acb.com 
 Dontaye Draper at cofcsports.com
 Dontaye Draper at eurobasket.com
 Dontaye Draper at euroleague.net
 Dontaye Draper at fiba.com
 
 

1984 births
Living people
ABA League players
American expatriate basketball people in Australia
American expatriate basketball people in Belgium
American expatriate basketball people in Croatia
American expatriate basketball people in France
American expatriate basketball people in Italy
American expatriate basketball people in Spain
American men's basketball players
Anadolu Efes S.K. players
Basketball players from Baltimore
BC Oostende players
Real Betis Baloncesto players
College of Charleston Cougars men's basketball players
Croatian expatriate basketball people in Spain
Croatian expatriate basketball people in Turkey
Croatian expatriate basketball people in France
Croatian expatriate basketball people in Russia
Croatian men's basketball players
Croatian people of African-American descent
HTV Basket players
KK Cedevita players
Liga ACB players
Naturalized citizens of Croatia
PBC Lokomotiv-Kuban players
Point guards
Real Madrid Baloncesto players
Sydney Kings players
Veroli Basket players